The Black and White Ball was a masquerade ball held on November 28, 1966, at the Plaza Hotel in New York City. Hosted by author Truman Capote, the ball was in honor of The Washington Post publisher Katharine Graham.

Impulse
Truman Capote decided in June 1966 to throw a lavish party. He was at the height of his popularity as an author and as a public figure following the publication of his non-fiction novel, In Cold Blood, earlier that year. For the first time Capote had the financial resources to host a party he deemed worthy of the friends he had cultivated in high society.

According to Capote's friend, the writer and editor Leo Lerman, Capote had declared in 1942 on a journey to the writer's colony Yaddo that when he, Capote, became rich and famous he would throw a party for his rich and famous friends. Capote always discounted the story but through constant repetition it became part of the ball's legend.

Capote's friend, author Dominick Dunne, had given a black and white ball in 1964 for his tenth wedding anniversary. Capote attended with Alvin Dewey and others he had met while researching In Cold Blood. Capote was also inspired by the "Ascot scene" from the film My Fair Lady in which the women were all dressed in black and white.

Planning
After deciding to throw the party, Capote had to select a guest of honor. Throwing the party for himself would have been viewed by his society friends as vulgar. Rather than selecting from amongst his stable of beautiful society women he called his "swans", Capote chose The Washington Post publisher Katharine Graham. "Truman called me up that summer and said, 'I think you need cheering up. And I'm going to give you a ball.'...I was...sort of baffled....I felt a little bit like Truman was going to give the ball anyway and that I was part of the props."

For his venue, Capote chose the Grand Ballroom of the Plaza Hotel in New York City. Capote had long held a deep affection for the Plaza, even setting the opening scene of his attempted first novel, Summer Crossing, in a Plaza dining room. Capote enlisted Evie Backer, who had decorated his apartment at United Nations Plaza, for the event's decor. Initially Capote planned to cover the ballroom's white and gold walls with heavy red drapes but Backer and Capote's friend Babe Paley convinced him to abandon this idea. Instead he brought in the color with red tablecloths. Rather than flowers, Capote had the tables adorned with gold candelabra wound with smilax and bearing white tapers. The menu, to be served at midnight, consisted of scrambled eggs, sausages, biscuits, pastries, spaghetti and meatballs and chicken hash, a specialty of the Plaza and one of Capote's favorite dishes.  To drink, Capote laid in 450 bottles of Taittinger champagne.

Capote spent $16,000 on the ball.

Guest list
Capote purchased a black-and-white composition book and spent most of July sitting by his friend Eleanor Friede's pool compiling his initial guest list. Capote carried the book with him everywhere he went for the next three months, constantly adding and deleting names. Among the guests were Katharine Graham, Lady Bird Johnson, Andy Warhol, the Duke and Duchess of Windsor, Gloria Vanderbilt, Babe Paley, Billy Baldwin, Marianne Moore, Harry Belafonte, the Maharani of Jaipur, Frank Sinatra, Candice Bergen, Gloria Guinness, Lee Radziwill, Brooke Astor, Pat Sheehan, Mia Farrow, and the Italian Princess Luciana Pignatelli (wearing a 60-carat diamond borrowed from Harry Winston).

November 28, 1966
Leading up to the ball, many guests attended one of sixteen small private dinner parties that Capote's friends had been drafted to host.

Aftermath
The Black and White Ball was credited for an immediate upsurge in masquerade and costume parties. It has been described as "a pinnacle of New York's social history".  Six days after the ball, on the December 4 episode of the television panel show What's My Line?, panelist Arlene Francis wore the mask she had worn at the party, transformed into a blindfold. The wearing of blindfolds during the show's special Mystery Guest segment was customary on the part of the panel.

Re-creations
Princess Yasmin Aga Khan hosted a Black and White Ball in 1991, commemorating the 25th anniversary of the original. The ball, held in a tent outside Tavern on the Green, was a charity event that raised $1.4 million for the Alzheimer's Association.

In anticipation of selling the contents of the Plaza Hotel, Christie's Auction House recreated the Black and White Ball in 2006 at Rockefeller Center. The event followed Capote's dress code, schedule and menu exactly and the Peter Duchin Orchestra, which had played the original, played the recreation.

TV chef Ina Garten recreated a scaled-down version of the event for a themed dinner party on her daytime cookery show Barefoot Contessa. She served chicken hash followed by French toast and truffles for dessert, in keeping with the black and white theme of Capote's party.

Notes

References
 Clarke, Gerald (1988). Capote: A Biography. New York, Simon & Schuster. .
 Davis, Deborah (2006). Party of the Century: The Fabulous Story of Truman Capote and His Black and White Ball. John Wiley & Sons. .
 Gathje, Curtis (2000). At the Plaza: An Illustrated History of the World's Most Famous Hotel. Macmillan. .
 Nowell, Iris (2004). Generation Deluxe: Consumerism and Philanthropy of the New Super-rich. Dundurn Press Ltd. .
 Plimpton, George (1997). Truman Capote: In Which Various Friends, Enemies, Acquaintances and Detractors Recall His Turbulent Career. New York, Doubleday. .

Balls in the United States
Masquerade balls
Truman Capote
1966 in New York City
November 1966 events in the United States